The IEEE Richard M. Emberson Award was established by the IEEE Board of Directors in 1986. It is presented to an IEEE member for distinguished service to the development, viability, advancement, and pursuit of the technical objectives of the IEEE.

Recipients of this award receives a bronze medal, illuminated certificate, honorarium, and travel expenses to award ceremony.

Recipients 
Source

References 

IEEE awards
Awards established in 1986
Richard M. Emberson Award